Sten Egil Bjørnø (born 7 November 1946) is a Norwegian politician for the Labour Party.

He served as a deputy representative to the Parliament of Norway from Vestfold during the term 1985–1989. In total he met during 6 days of parliamentary session. He was an industrial laborer in Larvik.

References

1946 births
Living people
Deputy members of the Storting
Labour Party (Norway) politicians
Vestfold politicians
People from Larvik
Place of birth missing (living people)
20th-century Norwegian politicians